Aristotelia pancaliella is a moth of the family Gelechiidae. It is found in Russia and Turkey.

The wingspan is about 10 mm. The forewings are olive-brown.

References

Moths described in 1871
Aristotelia (moth)
Moths of Europe
Moths of Asia